Cand.scient.pol. (Latin: candidatus/candidata scientiarum politicarum; Danish: kandidatgrad i statskundskab; English: candidate of political science) is a candidate's degree (i.e. an advanced degree) in political science, awarded by several Danish universities. The degree currently requires 5 years of study; it historically required 6 years of study. The current five-year degree is equivalent to, and is translated into English as, a Master of Science degree in political science. 

Until 2008, the equivalent degree awarded in Norway was called cand.polit, which in Denmark is a degree in economics.

20% of all members of parliament hold a cand.scient.pol. degree.

References

Academic degrees of Denmark
Political science education
Political science terminology
Latin words and phrases